Juan Martín Lucero (born 30 November 1991) is an Argentine footballer who currently plays as a forward for Campeonato Brasileiro Série A in Fortaleza Esporte Clube.

Career

Club Tijuana
On January 13, 2017, Lucero made his Liga MX debut against Puebla F.C. ending in a 6–2 win.

Honours

Club
Johor Darul Ta'zim
 Malaysia Charity Shield: 2016
 Malaysia FA Cup: 2016
 Malaysia Super League: 2016

Individual
 PFAM Player of the Month: April 2016

References

External links
 
 

Living people
1991 births
Argentine footballers
Argentine expatriate footballers
Defensa y Justicia footballers
Johor Darul Ta'zim F.C. players
Club Atlético Independiente footballers
Club Tijuana footballers
Godoy Cruz Antonio Tomba footballers
Colo-Colo footballers
Fortaleza Esporte Clube players
Argentine Primera División players
Primera Nacional players
Malaysia Super League players
Liga MX players
Chilean Primera División players
Campeonato Brasileiro Série A players
Sportspeople from Mendoza, Argentina
Association football forwards
Argentine expatriate sportspeople in Malaysia
Argentine expatriate sportspeople in Mexico
Argentine expatriate sportspeople in Chile
Argentine expatriate sportspeople in Brazil
Expatriate footballers in Malaysia
Expatriate footballers in Mexico
Expatriate footballers in Chile
Expatriate footballers in Brazil